"Sapés comme jamais" (English: Dressed like never) is a song by Congolese-French singer and rapper Maître Gims and Niska released in 2015.

Charts

Weekly charts

Year-end charts

Certifications

Awards and nominations

References

2015 singles
Gims songs
French-language songs
2015 songs
Songs written by Gims